Plymouth, Massachusetts, called "America's Hometown" on its welcome billboards  and a tourist train, is home to both Plymouth Rock and the Mayflower. It is where the pilgrims first set foot when they came to America in 1620, and where the first Thanksgiving took place. Over the past 400 years, Plymouth has grown from a small colony to a large community. With this much history in a town come stories of abandoned hospitals and old places that are now believed  to be haunted. Main Street Antiques Plymouth Massachusetts.

Places that have been called haunted

 Myles Standish State Forest
 Spooner House Museum
 Cordage Park

Myles Standish State Forest

Myles Standish was a soldier hired by the Separatists who came to be known as Pilgrims. He came to Plymouth on the Mayflower in 1620. He designed the first fort in Plymouth, and starting trading with various tribes. He kept Plymouth in defense and enforced the law throughout the colony. He went on trips back to England to trade goods to bring back to Plymouth. Some time in the 1630s, he founded Duxbury, a town not far from Plymouth. In another part of the woods lies a lot where a murder took place in 1977. A woman while biking in the forest was attacked and murdered by a man. The case was unsolved until 2003, when the man accused of murdering the women was finally captured and tried in court. It is believed that strange events happen in these locations, but is heavily patrolled by state police.

Spooner House Museum

The Spooner House Museum was built in 1747 and is run by five generations of the Spooner family. Located in the downtown Plymouth, The Spooner House Museum has been said to be haunted.  In 1778, Joshua Spooner was killed by three revolutionary soldiers at the behest of his wife, Bathsheba, and his body placed in a well.  She became the first woman to be hanged in the United States.

Cordage Park

Cordage Park opened in 1824 and was the largest factory located in Plymouth. Plymouth Cordage Company was a rope-making company that designed rope specifically for large ships. By the 1900s, it was the largest rope-making factory in the world. After World War II, the company couldn't compete against a more advanced form of rope made from fiber. In 1964, the factory finally closed down, ending its 140-year run. Many stories have been told of music being played throughout the old factory as well as children laughing too. Other stories tell of the old elevator operating on its own, and spirits that roam throughout. Another story is told of a boy who got caught in the smokestack and died. The stories of Cordage Park are always told because it is such a creepy place. Some people who have worked at Cordage Park such as night security guards have confirmed these stories. Such as walking up to one of the elevators in the back and saying "Hey can you get that for me", and the elevator opens on its own.

References

External links
 http://www.strangeusa.com/ViewLocation.aspx?locationid=5006

Reportedly haunted locations in Massachusetts
Plymouth, Massachusetts